HMS Montagu was a 60-gun fourth rate ship of the line of the Royal Navy, designed by Edward Allin and built at Sheerness Dockyard to the standard draught for 60-gun ships as specified by the 1745 Establishment, amended in 1750, and launched on 15 September 1757.

On 31 January 1759 Montagu and  chased a French privateer that Montague captured the next day. The privateer was Marquis de Martigny, of Granville. She had a crew of 104 men under the command of M. Le Crouse, and was armed with twenty 6-pounder guns.

Then on 15 February, Montagu captured the French privateer cutter Hardi Mendicant, of Dunkirk. Hardi Mendicant had a crew of 60 men under the command of M. Jean Meuleauer, and was armed with eight 6-pounder guns.

In 1761 Montagu participated in the invasion of Dominica. The expedition to Dominica which landed on 6 June 1761 was led by Colonel Andrew Rollo, the Brigadier-General in America who was in command of 26,000 troops, and Commodore James Douglas, Commander-in-Chief at the Leeward Islands, who commanded four ships of the line, the Montague, Sutherland, Belliqueux, his flag ship the Dublin, and two frigates. The fighting lasted for two days, before the French forces surrendered.

Fate
Montague served until 1774, when she was sunk to form part of a breakwater.

Citations and references
Citations

References

Lavery, Brian (2003) The Ship of the Line – Volume 1: The development of the battlefleet 1650–1850. Conway Maritime Press. .

Ships of the line of the Royal Navy
1757 ships